La Défense is a station of the Transilien (Réseau Saint-Lazare) suburban rail lines, RER commuter rail network, Paris Métro, as well as a stop of the Île-de-France tram network. In the future, Paris Metro Line 15 of Grand Paris Express will pass through here, making it a huge railway hub. It is underneath the Grande Arche building in La Défense, the business district just west of Paris. The station is the western terminus of Métro Line 1 and connects the RER A line to the Métro Line 1 station La Défense–Grande Arche since 1992, the Line 2 tramway since 1994 and SNCF (Transilien) train station. It is also attached to a major shopping centre. There are over 25 million entries and exits each year.

Highlights on the surface nearby include the monumental Grande Arche, skyscrapers that host the headquarters of important French and foreign companies, and works of urban art such as Le Pouce by César Baldaccini. From the central esplanade the Arc de Triomphe can be seen further down the Axe historique. Until May 2004, this part of La Défense hosted an information centre of the European Union managed by the European Parliament. Like the district it serves, the station takes its name from the 19th-century statue La Défense de Paris, commemorating the Franco-Prussian War.

Lines serving this station
 RER Line A (Paris Zone 1–2 tickets not valid)
 Line 1 (terminus, Paris Zone 1–2 tickets valid)
 Paris St Lazare Group III :
 SNCF Gare Saint-Lazare – St Nom la Breteche–Forêt de Marly
 SNCF Gare Saint-Lazare – Versailles Rive Droite
 SNCF La Défense – La Verrière
 Tram Line 2

There are four platforms in the Transilien station :

In the morning:
 Platforms 1 and 3 are used for PSL Group III lines to Paris
 Platform 2 is used for PSL Group III lines to Versailles Rive Droite / St Nom la Breteche – Forêt de Marly
 Platform 4 is used for La Défense – La Verrière line

In the afternoon:
 Platform 1 is used for PSL Group III lines to Paris
 Platforms 2 and 4 are used for PSL Group III lines to Versailles Rive Droite / St Nom la Breteche – Forêt de Marly
 Platform 3 is used for La Défense – La Verrière line

Station layout (Paris Métro)

Note: These are two side platforms located some distance apart, as opposed to one island platform; the layout does not show the platforms accurately.

Gallery

Metro

In popular culture 
Buffet froid, the film, begins at La Défense station.

See also
 List of stations of the Paris Métro
 List of stations of the Paris RER

References

Bibliography
Roland, Gérard (2003). Stations de métro. D’Abbesses à Wagram. Éditions Bonneton.

External links
 

Paris Métro stations in Puteaux
Réseau Express Régional stations
Railway stations in Hauts-de-Seine
La Défense
Railway stations in France opened in 1992
Railway stations located underground in France